Hidden Bay is a bay  long, lying between Cape Renard and Aguda Point on the northeast coast of Kyiv Peninsula, on the west coast of Graham Land. It was first charted by the Belgian Antarctic Expedition under Gerlache 1897–99, and was so named by the UK Antarctic Place-Names Committee in 1958 because from the north the bay is hidden by the Screen Islands.

References

 SCAR Composite Gazetteer of Antarctica.

Bays of Graham Land
Danco Coast